Frank Tyler may refer to:

Frank J. Tyler House, Waltham, Massachusetts
Frank M. Tyler, American architect
Frank Tyler, character in The $5,000,000 Counterfeiting Plot

See also
Francis Tyler (1904–1956), American bobsledder